Code: Selfish is a 1992 LP by British rock band The Fall. Their 14th full-length studio album, it entered the UK chart at number 21, although it spent only one week on the chart.

The album is characterised by its harsher sound in relation to the previous year's Shift-Work, and is influenced by techno music (techno fan Dave Bush had been added on keyboards and computers). Despite this, the album also has some notably mellow moments, with "Time Enough At Last" (named after an episode of The Twilight Zone) and "Gentlemen's Agreement" being at odds with the overall sound of the album.

Largely recorded in a converted church in Glasgow, Code: Selfish features the group's only self-penned Top 40 single, "Free Range". The album would prove to be their last for the Phonogram label, as the group were dropped following the release of the Ed's Babe EP later in 1992. Simon Ford reports in his Fall biography Hip Priest that Phonogram had to compensate the band for the early termination of their five-album deal and that these funds were used to record what became The Infotainment Scan.

The album was re-released by Voiceprint in 2002 under licence from Phonogram, and also appeared in a double-CD set coupled with an edition of Shift-Work on the same label in 2003. This edition added "Ed's Babe" and "Free Ranger" to the track listing. It was reissued again in expanded and remastered form by Universal in May 2007.

According to keyboard player Dave Bush, the song "Immortality" was partly inspired by Milan Kundera's 1990 novel of the same name .

Track listing

2007 reissue 
Disc one
 as per original edition

Disc two

Personnel 
The Fall
 Mark E. Smith – vocals, tapes, production
 Craig Scanlon – lead and rhythm guitars
 Steve Hanley – bass guitar
 Simon Wolstencroft – drums, keyboards
 Dave Bush – keyboards, machines
Additional personnel
 Craig Leon – keyboards, production
 Simon Rogers – keyboards, production
 Cassell Webb – backing vocals
 Pascal Le Gras – cover art
 Dale Griffin – production on John Peel sessions
 The Fall – production on "Legend of Xanadu" (recorded at Suite 16, Rochdale, Greater Manchester)

References

External links 
 Lyrics

1992 albums
The Fall (band) albums
Albums produced by Craig Leon
Fontana Records albums